Nucleus is an album by jazz saxophonist Sonny Rollins, released on the Milestone label in 1975, featuring performances by Rollins with George Duke, Raul de Souza, Bennie Maupin, Chuck Rainey, Eddie Moore, Mtume, Bob Cranshaw and Roy McCurdy. It was recorded at Fantasy Studios, Berkeley, CA, on September 2–5, 1975.

Reception
The Allmusic review by Scott Yanow states: "This funky date has its moments (including an updated version of "My Reverie") but falls far short of hinting at any new innovations." Music critic Robert Christgau praised the album, writing: "This is as rich an r&b saxophone record as I know, combining repetition and invention, melodies recalled and melodies unimaginable, in proportions that define the difference between selling out and reaching out.... If you really believe you don't like 'jazz,' this is as good a place to start as any."

Track listing
All compositions by Sonny Rollins except as indicated.
 "Lucille" - 6:08
 "Gwaligo" - 5:58
 "Are You Ready?" - 4:08
 "Azalea" - 4:46
 "Newkleus" (James Mtume) - 5:17
 "Cosmet" - 7:20
 "My Reverie" (Larry Clinton, based on Claude Debussy's "Reverie") - 7:39

Personnel
Sonny Rollins - tenor saxophone, soprano saxophone
George Duke - piano, electric piano & synthesizer (track 1,3,5-7)
Raul de Souza - trombone (tracks 1-4,6,7)
Bennie Maupin - tenor saxophone (all), tenor saxophone soloist on 4, bass clarinet (track 7), saxello (track 6), lyricon (track 5)
Blackbyrd McKnight - guitar (tracks: 1-3,5,6); soloist on 2,3
David Amaro - guitar; soloist on 1 
Chuck Rainey - electric bass (tracks 1-3,6)
Bob Cranshaw - electric bass (tracks 4,5,7)
Eddie Moore - drums (tracks 1-3,6)
Roy McCurdy - drums (tracks 4,5,7)
Mtume - congas & percussion (1-4,6), lead guitar (track 5)

References

1975 albums
Milestone Records albums
Sonny Rollins albums
Albums produced by Orrin Keepnews